Bhilai Charoda is a municipal corporation and a part of Bhilai city in the state of Chhattisgarh, India. Charoda is an industrial area of Bhilai city. Asia's longest railway marshaling yard is present in Charoda, Bhilai.

Demographics
As of 2001[update] India census Charoda had a population of 98,008. Males constitute 52% of the population and females 48%. Charoda has an average literacy rate of 77.63%, higher than the national average of 74.04%; with male literacy of 87.19% and female literacy of 67.96%. 13% of the population is under 6 years of age. The Sex Ratio of Bhilai Charoda is 995. Thus per every 1000 men, there were 995 females in Bhilai Charoda. Also, as per Census, the Child Sex Ration was 1,034 which is greater than the Average Sex Ratio ( 989 ) of Chhattisgarh. Bhilai (charoda) is situated equidistant, 20 kilometers, from Durg and Raipur (the state capital). Charoda comprises three sub-towns. Bhilai Marshalling Yard (BMY), Charoda Basti, and Deobaloda. BMY is a railway yard/colony, famous for being the biggest traction shed, once upon a time. Basti is a place where most of the retired people from BMY settle down. Deobaloda, historically, is the oldest in all three sub-towns. People, who besides here are mostly railway employees.

Places of interest
Deobaloda has an ancient temple of Lord Shiva called Mahadev temple built by the Kalachuris during the 13th century. This is a very beautiful temple and has a pond near it. People believe that this pond has an underground link to another old town in Chhattisgarh state named Arang.

Besides Deobaloda, Charoda has some temples like a Lord Hanuman temple, Kali Badi, Lord Sri Ram temple, Lord Sri Jagannath temple, a Church - St. Vincent Palloti Church, a Mosque beside other places of worship.

The oldest English Medium School here is Jyoti Vidyalaya which was started by the FIH sisters in 1969 and later they also built a hospital and a  church in the name of Jyoti.

Transport
Charoda is well connected with other cities, NH-53 highway passes from charoda and also has a railway station named " Deobaloda charoda". Deobaloda is separated from BMY by the main railway line (Mumbai - Howrah). BMY and Basti are separated by GE Road (National Highway 53). This highway is four-lane between Bhilai and Raipur. Means of transport constitute city buses(public buses), buses(private buses), tempos, autos. In the rail route, the main station is Devbaloda charoda along with various railway cabin halts and the nearest major railway station is Bhilai Power House and Durg Jn.

References

Cities and towns in Durg district